The Burnaby City Council is the governing body for the City of Burnaby, British Columbia, Canada.

The council consists of the mayor and eight elected city councillors representing the city as a whole. Municipal elections also select seven school trustees.

Municipal elections are held every four years across the Province on the third Saturday of October or the third Saturday of November.

Burnaby City Council members

Current (2022-present)
Elected in the 2022 municipal election 

Council membership

2018–2022
Elected in the 2018 municipal election and 2021 by-election 

Council membership :

Notes

2014–2018
Elected in the 2014 municipal election

2011–2014
Elected in the 2011 municipal election

References

Burnaby City Council
Burnaby Citizens Association, BCA

Municipal councils in British Columbia
Politics of Burnaby